Freon is a registered trademark of the Chemours Company and generic descriptor for a number of halocarbon products. They are stable, nonflammable, low toxicity gases or liquids which have generally been used as refrigerants and as aerosol propellants. These include the chlorofluorocarbons (CFCs) that cause ozone depletion and HCFCs (such as chlorodifluoromethane). Not all refrigerants of this type are labelled as "Freon" since Freon is a brand name for the refrigerants R-12, R-13B1, R-22, R-410A, R-502, and R-503 manufactured by The Chemours Company. Freon emits a strong chemical smell similar to acetone, a nail polish remover component.

History
The first CFCs were synthesized by Frédéric Swarts in the 1890s. In the late 1920s, a research team was formed by Charles Franklin Kettering in General Motors to find a replacement for the dangerous refrigerants then in use, such as ammonia. The team was headed by Thomas Midgley, Jr. In 1928, they improved the synthesis of CFCs and demonstrated their usefulness for such a purpose and their stability and nontoxicity. Kettering patented a refrigerating apparatus to use the gas; this was issued to Frigidaire, a wholly owned subsidiary of General Motors.

In 1930, General Motors and DuPont formed Kinetic Chemicals to produce Freon. Their product was dichlorodifluoromethane and is now designated "Freon-12", "R-12", or "CFC-12". The number after the R is a refrigerant class number developed by DuPont to systematically identify single halogenated hydrocarbons, as well as other refrigerants besides halocarbons.

Most uses of CFCs are now banned or severely restricted by the Montreal Protocol of August 1987, as they have been shown to be responsible for ozone depletion. Brands of freon containing hydrofluorocarbons (HFCs) instead have replaced many uses, but they, too, are under strict control under the Kyoto Protocol, as they are deemed "super-greenhouse effect" gases.

See also
 Chlorodifluoromethane (R-22 or HCFC-22), a type of Freon.
 Dichlorodifluoromethane (R-12 or CFC-12), the most commonly used Freon brand refrigerant prior to its ban in many countries in 1996 and total ban in 2010.
 1,1,1,2-Tetrafluoroethane (R-134a or HCFC-134a), one of the main replacements for the formerly widespread R-12.
 Opteon halogenated olefins now replacing Freons in many applications.

References

Refrigerants
Chemours
DuPont products